, often referred to as TMU, is a public research university in Japan.

Origin 
The origin of Tokyo Metropolitan University was Prefectural Higher School, under the old system of education, established by Tokyo Prefecture in 1929 as the third public higher school. The School was modeled on Eton College, with three years of advanced course and four years of regular course.

The seven-year system had an advantage to assure the entrance to Imperial universities at the age of Middle School, and the typical passway for academic elites before the end of the Pacific War was to enter Tokyo First Middle School, proceeding First Higher School and Tokyo Imperial University.

Since the jurisdiction control of Tokyo First Middle School and First Higher School were different, however, Tokyo First Middle School attempted to originally establish the prefectural higher school, whereas the other Middle Schools opposed to the said attempt. Prefectural Higher School was established in 1929 locating in the same site of Tokyo First Middle School, as a result of the opposition.

In 1932, Prefectural Higher School was relocated to 1–1–1 Yakumo, Meguro and became known one if the best higher schools with First Higher School. As the reign of Tokyo Metropolis was enacted in 1943, Prefectural Higher School was renamed to Metropolitan Higher School.

After the reform of the educational system in 1949, Tokyo Metropolitan University (former) was established as a research university consisting of three faculties, namely Faculty of Humanities, Faculty of Science and Faculty of Technology; three years of advanced course was reorganised to Senior High School affiliated to Tokyo Metropolitan University, whereas four years of regular course was restructured to Liberal arts college and other faculties. Five Prefectural Colleges, namely Tokyo Prefectural College of Technology, Tokyo Prefectural College of Science, Tokyo Prefectural College of Machine Industry, Tokyo Prefectural College of Chemical Industry and Tokyo Prefectural College of Women were also merged to Tokyo Metropolitan University. In 1957, Faculty of Law and Economics was separated from Faculty of Humanities, and reorganised as Faculty of Law and Faculty of Economics in 1966.

As expanding its organisation, the university was relocated to 1–1–1 Minami-Osawa, Hachioji in 1991.

The university signed the student exchange agreement with University of Vienna in 1997.

History
The following history includes the former institution of Tokyo Metropolitan University.
 1949 – Tokyo Metropolitan University was established with three faculties, namely Humanities, Science and Technology
 1953 – Master's courses of Anthropology, Social Science, Natural Science and Technology were set up
 1955 – Doctoral courses of Anthropology, Social Science, Natural Science and Technology were set up
 1957 – Faculty of Law and Economics was set up
 1966 – Faculty of Law and Economics was reorganised as Faculty of Law and Faculty of Economics
 1977 – Centre of Metropolitan Study was set up
 1994 – Centre of Metropolitan Study was reorganised as Institute of Metropolitan Study
 1996 – Master's course of Metropolitan Science was set up
 1998 – Doctoral course of Metropolitan Science was set up
 1991 – The campus was transferred from Meguro to Minami-Osawa
 2003 – Institute of Social Science launched to provide MBA course (Business school)
 2005 – Institute of Social Science launched to provide LLM course (Law school)
 2005 – Tokyo Metropolitan University was reformed with integrating three metropolitan universities and one junior college, which consists of 4 faculties, 7 divisions with 21 courses as well as 6 graduate schools (the organisation took over the former one) with 36 majors
 2006 – Faculty of System Design opened the course of industrial art, and institutes were reorganised
 2008 – Faculty of Urban Environment Sciences launched the course of nature- and culture- based tourism, and Graduate School of Urban Environmental Sciences launched the major of tourism science
 2009 – Faculty of Urban Liberal Arts launched the course of economics
 2010 – Graduate School of System Design launched the major of industrial art
 2011 – Tokyo Metropolitan University (former) was closed
 2014 – Bangkok Office was set up in Bangkok, Thailand
 2016 – Business School will be transferred from Shinjuku Satellite Campus to Marunouchi Satellite Campus with launching the course of Master of Finance

University reform 
In later 1990s, Government and local municipalities facilitated to reform the administrative scheme and financial management in line with economic bubble burst and financial difficulties due to Japan's progressive low birthrate and longevity. As a part of the said administrative and financial reform, social interest grew on restructuring national and public universities to independent administrative agencies with consolidating them. Tokyo Metropolitan University was also planned by Tokyo Metropolitan Government to be consolidated with aforementioned three metropolitan universities and one junior college.

As a result of Tokyo gubernatorial election in April 2003, Shintaro Ishihara was re-elected as Governor of Tokyo, holding up a promise "I will establish a revolutionary university", and consequently the original restructure plan was significantly and rapidly changed, in terms of the organisation of faculties, course structure, etc. During this process, many faculty staff left the university for making strong protest against the reform.

Faculties (undergraduate)

Faculty of Humanities and Social Sciences
Department of Human and Social Sciences
Sociology
Social Anthropology
Social Welfare
Psychology
Pedagogy
Language Sciences
Japanese Language Education
Department of Humanities
Philosophy
History and Archaeology
Studies of Culture and Representation
Japanese Cultures
Chinese Cultures
English Studies
German Studies
French Studies

Faculty of Law
Department of Law
Division of Law
Division of Political Science

Faculty of Economics and Business Administration
Department of Economics and Business Administration
Economics Program
Business Administration Program

Faculty of Science
Department of Mathematical Science
Department of Physics
Department of Chemistry
Department of Biological Sciences

Faculty of Urban Environmental Sciences
Department of Geography
Department of Civil and Environmental Engineering
Department of Architecture
Department of Applied Chemistry for Environment
Department of Tourism Science
Department of Urban Science and Policy

Faculty of Systems Design
Department of Computer Science
Department of Electrical Engineering and Computer Science
Department of Mechanical Systems Engineering
Department of Aeronautics and Astronautics
Department of Industrial Art

Faculty of Health Sciences
Department of Nursing Sciences
Department of Physical Therapy
Department of Occupational Therapy
Department of Radiological Sciences

Graduate schools

Graduate School of Humanities
Department of Behavioral Social Sciences
Sociology 
Social Anthropology 
Social Welfare 
Department of Human Sciences
Psychology 
Clinical Psychology 
Pedagogy 
Language Sciences 
Japanese Language Education 
Department of Philosophy, History and Cultural Studies
Philosophy
Philosophy 
Classical Studies 
History 
Studies of Culture and Representation 
Department of Intercultural Studies
Intercultural Studies of Japanese and Asia
Japanese 
Chinese 
Intercultural Studies of European and American
English 
German 
French

Graduate School of Law and Politics
Department of Law and Politics
Division of Law
Division of Political Science
Law School
2-year curriculum
3-year curriculum

Graduate School of Management
Department of Management
Business Administration (MBA) Program
Economics (MEc) Program
Finance (MF) Program

Graduate School of Science
Department of Mathematical Sciences
Department of Physics
Department of Chemistry
Department of Biological Sciences

Graduate School of Urban Environmental Sciences
Department of Geography
Department of Civil and Environmental Engineering
Department of Architecture and Building Engineering
Department of Applied Chemistry for Environment
Department of Tourism Science
Department of Urban Science and Policy

Graduate School of Systems Design
Department of Computer Science
Department of Electrical Engineering and Computer Science
Department of Mechanical Systems Engineering
Department of Aeronautics and Astronautics
Department of Industrial Art

Graduate School of Human Health Sciences
Department of Nursing Sciences
Department of Physical Therapy
Department of Occupational Therapy
Department of Radiological Sciences
Department of Frontier Health Sciences
Department of Health Promotion Sciences

Campuses 
 Minami-Osawa Campus (Main campus)
 Hino Campus (Faculty of System Design and Graduate School of System Design)
 Arakawa Campus (Faculty of Health Sciences and Graduate School of Human Health Sciences)
 Harumi Campus (Law School)
 Marunouchi Satellite Campus (Business School)

Facilities 
 Computer Centre and Information Processing Facilities
 Science and Technology Research Facilities
 The Makino Herbarium
 International House
 Ogasawara Field Research Station
 External Facility in Fujimi-kogen Highlands (two-story log-house)
 Bangkok Office

Research Centres 
Lecturers of the university has been all highly regarded in their respective fields, and the standard of the research carried out by each of them has been considered as extremely high. In line with this, research groups that produce outstanding results and have the potential to become international research hubs, or those working in unique fields that are aligned with the university's mission, are designated as "research centres" and given support by the university.
 Research Centre for Space Science (Director: Prof. Takaya Ohashi)
 Research Centre for Genomics and Bioinformatics (Director: Prof. Koichiro Tamura)
 Research Centre for Artificial Photosynthesis (Director: Prof. Haruo Inoue)
 Research Centre for Gold Chemistry (Director: Prof. Masatake Haruta)
 Research Centre for Language, Brain and Genetics (Director: Prof. Hiroko Hagiwara)
 Research Centre for Water System Engineering (Director: Prof. Akira Koizumi)
 Research Centre for Community Centric Systems (Director: Prof .Toru Yamaguchi)
 Research Centre for Child and Adolescent Poverty Overview (Director: Prof. Aya Abe)

International Partner Institutions 
The university has concluded agreements with the overseas educational institutions with the aim of promoting international cooperation in education and research as well as student exchange.

Asia 

 Thailand
 Mahidol University
 Thammasat University
 King Mongkut's University of Technology Thonburi
 Chulalongkorn University

 Malaysia
 Universiti Teknologi Malaysia
 University of Malaya
 Universiti Putra Malaysia
 University Kebangsaan Malaysia

 Indonesia
 Indonesia University of Education
 University of Indonesia
 BINUS University

 Hong Kong
 College of Liberal Arts and Social Sciences, City University of Hong Kong

 South Korea
 Chung-Ang University
 Hanyang University
 University of Seoul
 Kumoh National Institute of Technology
 Sookmyung Women's University
 Incheon National University
 Chonnam National University

 Vietnam
 Hue University
 Water Resources University
 Hue University of Medicine and Pharmacy

 China
 Northeastern University
 International Cultural Exchange School of Fudan University
 Capital Normal University
 Jinlin University
 South China University of Technology

 Taiwan
 Chinese Culture University
 National Taiwan Normal University
 National Chung Cheng University
 Taipei Municipal University of Education
 National Tsing Hua University
 Fu Jen Catholic University
 National Dong Hwa University
 National Sun Yat-sen University

 Turkey
 Sabanci University
 Yaşar University

 Australia
 Royal Melbourne Institute of Technology
 Edith Cowan University
 Macquarie University
 Institute of Continuing & TESOL Education, University of Queensland
 University of Western Sydney
 University of Wollongong
 The University of Newcastle

North America 

 Canada
 Royal Roads University
 University of Waterloo
 The University of Western Ontario
 Memorial University of Newfoundland
 University of Manitoba
 Saint Mary's University
 University of Regina

 United States of America
 Murray State University
 Eastern Washington University
 University of California, Riverside, Extension
 University of Wisconsin-Green Bay
 Georgia Institute of Technology

Europe 

 Finland
 University of Jyväskylä

 Sweden
 Umeå University

 Norway
 Buskerud and Vestfold University College

 Ireland
 University College Cork

 United Kingdom
 Oxford Brookes University
 The School of Oriental and African Studies, University of London
 Bangor University
 University of Hull
 University of Leicester
 University of Birmingham
 University of York
 University of Nottingham
 University of Aberdeen
 Northumbria University
 Keele University
 University of Portsmouth

 Netherlands
 Rotterdam University of Applied Sciences

 Germany
 Fachhochschule Kaiserslautern – University of Applied Sciences
 Koblenz University of Applied Science
 University of Bayreuth

 France
 Lille 1 University
 Paris-South 11 University
 Rennes 2 University
 The International Organization for Research and Education on Mechatronics

 Spain
 Cardenal Cisneros University College, Alcala University
 The University of Alcala
 University of A Coruña

 Italy
 The Politecnico di Milano
 University of Basilicata
 Sapienza University of Rome
 The University of Rome "Tor Vergata"

 Austria
 The University of Vienna

 Poland
 AGH University of Science and Technology
 University of Wroclaw

 Hungary
 Óbuda University

 Bulgaria
 Technical University of Sofia

 Russia
 Tomsk State University
 Tomsk Polytechnic University

 Lithuania
 Siauliai University

Notable alumni 
 (坂野 正高 Banno Masataka)
Yukihiko Yaguchi is a Japanese automotive engineer.

Notable faculty

Academic reputation 

Although its small size and young history in contrast to national universities and several leading private universities, the university has been one of the most reputable institutions in Japan. According to the Times Higher Education World University Rankings, it ranks 7th in 2014–2015 among 781 universities in Japan, behind renowned national universities, namely University of Tokyo, Kyoto University, Tokyo Institute of Technology, Osaka University, Tohoku University and Nagoya University. The university received the highest score of 100.0 for "citations.”

In 2012, Prof. Masatake Haruta was selected as a Thomson Reuters Citation Laureate as a possible winner of the Nobel Prize for his "independent foundational discoveries of catalysis by gold."

References

External links

 

 
Educational institutions established in 2005
Public universities in Japan
2005 establishments in Japan
Hachiōji, Tokyo
Hino, Tokyo
Arakawa, Tokyo
Universities and colleges in Tokyo